Risum-Lindholm is a municipality in the district of Nordfriesland, in Schleswig-Holstein, Germany.

Geography

Location 
Risum-Lindholm lies about five kilometres southeast of Niebüll and six kilometres west of Leck on a boundary between a low, sandy area of geest and the marshes.

Villages 

The municipality was formed in 1969 from the formerly independent municipalities of Risum and Lindholm. Because it extends over several kilometres, the villages of Maasbüll (North Frisian: Moosbel, Danish: Masbøl), Risum (NF: Risem), Lindholm (NF: Lunham), Klockries (NF: Klookriis, Dan: Klokris), Wegacker (NF: Wäieeker) and Kremperhaus (Dan. Krempehus) (beside Broweg (NF: Bruwäi), Läiged, Legerade (NF: Läigeroos) and Herrenkoog (NF: Hiirnekuch, Dan: Herrekog), which do not lie on the long village street) are of great importance for describing a location. In local usage, the actual municipal name is rarely used, but rather the name of the respective village.

Notable people
 Momme Andresen (1857-1951), born in Risum, industrial chemist who made practical developments in photography including the invention of Rodinal

References

Nordfriesland